The white-bellied slender opossum (Marmosops noctivagus) is a species of opossum from South America. It is found in Bolivia, Brazil, Ecuador and Peru.

Recent research suggests that M. dorothea is a synonym of M. noctivagus.

References

Opossums
Marsupials of South America
Mammals of Bolivia
Mammals of Brazil
Mammals of Ecuador
Mammals of Peru
Fauna of the Amazon
Mammals described in 1845